In mathematics, a parametric equation defines a group of quantities as functions of one or more independent variables called parameters. Parametric equations are commonly used to express the coordinates of the points that make up a geometric object such as a curve or surface, called  parametric curve and parametric surface, respectively. In such cases, the equations are collectively called a parametric representation, or parametric system, or parameterization (alternatively spelled as parametrisation) of the object. 

For example, the equations

form a parametric representation of the unit circle, where t is the parameter: A point (x, y) is on the unit circle if and only if there is a value of t such that these two equations generate that point. Sometimes the parametric equations for the individual scalar output variables are combined into a single parametric equation in vectors:

Parametric representations are generally nonunique (see the "Examples in two dimensions" section below), so the same quantities may be expressed by a number of different parameterizations. 

In addition to curves and surfaces, parametric equations can describe manifolds and algebraic varieties of higher dimension, with the number of parameters being equal to the dimension of the manifold or variety, and the number of equations being equal to the dimension of the space in which the manifold or variety is considered (for curves the dimension is one and one parameter is used,  for surfaces dimension two and two parameters, etc.).

Parametric equations are commonly used in kinematics, where the trajectory of an object is represented by equations depending on time as the parameter. Because of this application, a single parameter is often labeled t; however, parameters can represent other physical quantities (such as geometric variables) or can be selected arbitrarily for convenience. Parameterizations are non-unique; more than one set of parametric equations can specify the same curve.

Applications

Kinematics
In kinematics, objects' paths through space are commonly described as parametric curves, with each spatial coordinate depending explicitly on an independent parameter (usually time). Used in this way, the set of parametric equations for the object's coordinates collectively constitute a vector-valued function for position. Such parametric curves can then be integrated and differentiated termwise. Thus, if a particle's position is described parametrically as 

then its velocity can be found as 

and its acceleration as
.

Computer-aided design
Another important use of parametric equations is in the field of computer-aided design (CAD). For example, consider the following three representations, all of which are commonly used to describe planar curves.

Each representation has advantages and drawbacks for CAD applications.

The explicit representation may be very complicated, or even may not exist. Moreover, it does not behave well under geometric transformations, and in particular under rotations. On the other hand, as a parametric equation and an implicit equation may easily be deduced from an explicit representation, when a simple explicit representation exists, it has the advantages of both other representations.

Implicit representations may make it difficult to generate points on the curve, and even to decide whether there are real points. On the other hand, they are well suited for deciding whether a given point is on a curve, or whether it is inside or outside of a closed curve.

Such decisions may be difficult with a parametric representation, but parametric representations are best suited for generating points on a curve, and for plotting it.

Integer geometry
Numerous problems in integer geometry can be solved using parametric equations. A classical such solution is Euclid's parametrization of right triangles such that the lengths of their sides  and their hypotenuse  are coprime integers. As a and b are not both even (otherwise   and  would not be coprime), one may exchange them to have  even, and the parameterization is then

Implicitization
Converting a set of parametric equations to a single implicit equation involves eliminating the variable  from the simultaneous equations  This process is called implicitization. If one of these equations can be solved for t, the expression obtained can be substituted into the other equation to obtain an equation involving x and y only: Solving  to obtain  and using this in  gives the explicit equation  while more complicated cases will give an implicit equation of the form 

If the parametrization is given by rational functions

where  are set-wise coprime polynomials, a resultant computation allows one to implicitize.

In higher dimensions (either more than two coordinates or more than one parameter), the implicitization of rational parametric equations may by done with Gröbner basis computation; see Gröbner basis § Implicitization in higher dimension.

To take the example of the circle of radius a, the parametric equations

can be implicitized in terms of x and y  by way of the Pythagorean trigonometric identity:

As

and
  
we get 
 
and thus

which is the standard equation of a circle centered at the origin.

Examples in two dimensions

Parabola

The simplest equation for a parabola,

can be (trivially) parameterized by using a free parameter t, and setting

Explicit equations
More generally, any curve given by an explicit equation

can be (trivially) parameterized by using a free parameter t, and setting

Circle

A more sophisticated example is the following. Consider the unit circle which is described by the ordinary (Cartesian) equation

This equation can be parameterized as follows: 

With the Cartesian equation it is easier to check whether a point lies on the circle or not. With the parametric version it is easier to obtain points on a plot.

In some contexts, parametric equations involving only rational functions (that is fractions of two polynomials) are preferred, if they exist. In the case of the circle, such a rational parameterization is 

Ellipse

An ellipse in canonical position (center at origin, major axis along the X-axis) with semi-axes a and b can be represented parametrically as

An ellipse in general position can be expressed as

as the parameter t varies from 0 to 2.

Both parameterizations may be made rational by using the tangent half-angle formula and setting

Lissajous curve 

A Lissajous curve is similar to an ellipse, but the x and y sinusoids are not in phase. In canonical position, a Lissajous curve is given by

Hyperbola
An east-west opening hyperbola can be represented parametrically by
  or, rationally  

A north-south opening hyperbola can be represented parametrically as
  or, rationally  

In all these formulae (h, k) are the center coordinates of the hyperbola, a is the length of the semi-major axis, and b is the length of the semi-minor axis.

Hypotrochoid
A hypotrochoid is a curve traced by a point attached to a circle of radius r rolling around the inside of a fixed circle of radius R, where the point is at a distance d from the center of the interior circle. 

The parametric equations for the hypotrochoids are:

Examples in three dimensions

Helix

Parametric equations are convenient for describing curves in higher-dimensional spaces. For example:

describes a three-dimensional curve, the helix, with a radius of a and rising by 2πb units per turn. The equations are identical in the plane to those for a circle.
Such expressions as the one above are commonly written as

where r is a three-dimensional vector.

Parametric surfaces

A torus with major radius R and minor radius r may be defined parametrically as

where the two parameters t and u both vary between 0 and 2π.

As u varies from 0 to 2π the point on the surface moves about a short circle passing through the hole in the torus. As t varies from 0 to 2π the point on the surface moves about a long circle around the hole in the torus.

Example with vectors

The parametric equation of the line through the point  and parallel to the vector  is

Underdetermined linear systems 
A system of  linear equations in  unknowns is underdetermined if it has more than one solution. In this case, one can select  unknowns as parameters and represent all solutions as a parametric equation where all unknowns are expressed as linear combinations of the selected ones. That is, if the unknowns are  one can reorder them for expressing the solutions as

Such a parametric equation is called a parametric form of the solution of the system.

The standard method for computing a parametric form of the solution it to use Gaussian elimination for computing a reduced row echelon form of the augmented matrix. Then the unknowns that can be used as parameters are the ones that correspond to columns not containing any leading entry (that is the left most non zero entry in a row or the matrix), and the parametric form can be straightforwardly deduced.

See also 
Curve
Parametric estimating
Position vector
Vector-valued function
Parametrization by arc length
Parametric derivative

Notes

External links

Web application to draw parametric curves on the plane

Multivariable calculus
Equations
Geometry processing